Adam Greenberg may refer to:
Adam Greenberg (baseball) (born 1981), Major League Baseball outfielder
Adam Greenberg (cinematographer) (born 1939), cinematographer noted for his work in Israel and the United States
Adam Greenberg (musician), musician and singer-songwriter of the band Senator